Antoine Louis Gustave Béclère (17 March 1856, Paris - 24 February 1939), virologist, immunologist, was a pioneer in radiology. In 1897 he created the first laboratory of radiology in Paris.

References

French virologists
French immunologists
1856 births
1939 deaths